"How I'm Comin'" is a song by LL Cool J, released as the first single from his fifth album, 14 Shots to the Dome.  It was released on February 15, 1993 for Def Jam Recordings and featured production from Marley Marl, QDIII and LL Cool J. The drum loop in the song is sampled from "The Humpty Dance" by Digital Underground.

"How I'm Comin'" proved to be a minor success, making it to 1 on the Billboard Rap Tracks charts, 57 on the Billboard Hot 100.

Track listing

A-side
"How I'm Comin'" (LP Version)- 5:04
"How I'm Comin'" (Instrumental)- 52

B-side
"Buckin' Em Down" (LP Version)- 4:04
"Buckin' Em Down" (Instrumental)- 4:04

See also
 List of Billboard number-one rap singles of the 1980s and 1990s

References

1992 songs
1993 singles
LL Cool J songs
Def Jam Recordings singles
Song recordings produced by Marley Marl
Songs written by LL Cool J
Songs written by Quincy Jones